Renewable energy in Portugal was the source for 25.7% of total energy consumption in 2013. In 2014, 27% of Portugal's energy needs were supplied by renewable sources. In 2016, 28% of final energy consumption in Portugal came from renewable sources.

Portugal aims to be climate neutral by 2050 and to cover 80% of its electricity consumption with renewables by 2030.

In 2018, Portugal committed to close all of the country's coal producing facilities by 2030, making it almost completely reliant on renewable energy in the coming years. As of 2019, coal still provided 40% of Portugal's electricity needs. The last Portuguese coal power plant closed on 19 November 2021.

Development 
In 2001, the Portuguese government launched a new energy policy instrument – the E4 Programme (Energy efficiency and Endogenous Energies), consisting of a set of multiple, diversified measures aimed at promoting a consistent, integrated approach to energy supply and demand. By promoting energy efficiency and the use of renewable energy (endogenous) sources, the programme sought to upgrade the competitiveness of the Portuguese economy and to modernize the country's social fabric, while preserving the environment by reducing gas emissions, especially the carbon dioxide.

While from 2002 to 2007 the main priorities were focused on the introduction of :natural gas (aiming at progressively replacing oil and coal in the energy balance) and liberalization of the energy market (by opening this former state-owned sector to competition and private investment), the emphasis shifted for the next 5 years was on energy efficiency (supply and demand sides) and use of endogenous (renewable) energy.

During February 2016, an equivalent to 95% of electricity consumed in Portugal was produced by renewable sources such as biomass, hydropower, wind power and solar power. A total of 4139 GWh was produced by these sources. In May 2016, all of Portugal's electricity was produced renewably for a period of over four days, a landmark achievement for a modern European country.

The renewable energy produced in Portugal fell from 55.5% of the total electricity produced in 2016 to 41.8% in 2017, due to the drought of 2017, which severely affected the production of hydro electricity. The sources of the renewable energy that was produced in Portugal in 2017 were Wind power with 21.6% of the total (up from 20.7% in 2016), Hydro power with 13.3% (down from 28.1% in 2016), Bioenergy with 5.1% (same as in 2016), Solar power with 1.6% (up from 1.4% in 2016), Geothermal energy with 0.4% (up from 0.3% in 2016) and a small amount of Wave power in the Azores. 24% of the energy produced in the Azores is geothermal.

On July 14, 2020, EDP announced it would be closing the country's largest coal-fired power station, in Sines, by January 2021. In effect, Sines's power plant was closed on the 15th of January 2021, nearly ten years earlier than initially forecasted. The plant was responsible for 12% of all greenhouse emissions in Portugal, and its closure meant the biggest decrease in polluting emissions in the country's history. The Pego coal plant was the only coal-fired facility functioning until 19 November 2021 when it too was shut down.

It is estimated that around 20,000 jobs will be created until 2030 in the solar-photovoltaic industry alone, with EDP having announced an investment of 24 billion Euros in the renewable industry until 2026, most of which directed at wind, solar and green hydrogen production.

Hydro power

As of 2020, hydroelectricity accounted for 28% of the total amount of electricity produced in Portugal from renewable sources.

The largest hydroelectric power station is at the Alto Lindoso dam, with a capacity of 630 MW. Portugal has about 100 small hydro systems, with a capacity of 256 MW, which produce 815 GWh/year.

Wind power

At the end of 2018, wind power capacity in Continental Portugal was 5,368 MW. In 2020, wind powered energy was responsible for 24% of electricity production.
 
Portugal combines wind and hydropower by using nighttime winds to pump water uphill and sending the water back through generators to produce power the next day; the so-called Pumped-storage hydroelectricity.

Solar power

At the end of 2018, solar power had a total installed capacity of 828 MW. It represented 2.2% of total power generation in 2019.

Geothermal power

Portugal's main investment for the use of this type of energy is in the Azores. Small scale use of this energy source began in the 1980s in Chaves and S. Pedro do Sul, Continental Portugal providing 3 MWt.

In the Azores the use of Geothermal energy is widespread, with production in 8 of the 9 Islands, collectively producing some 235.5 MWt. In 2003, 25% of the electricity consumed in São Miguel was produced by geothermal energy.

Wave power

Aguçadoura Wave Farm was the world's first commercial wave farm when it opened on 23 September 2008. It was located three miles (5 km) offshore near Póvoa de Varzim north of Porto.  The farm used three Pelamis wave energy converters to convert the motion of the ocean surface waves into electricity. The wave farm was shut down in November 2008, just over two months after the official opening.

In the 2010s, a local company, Wave Roller installed many devices along the coast to make use of the water power.

Biogas

In 2011, Portugal produced 45 ktoe (Kiloton of Oil Equivalent) of biogas.

See also

List of renewable energy topics by country
Renewable energy in the European Union
Energy policy of the European Union
Renewable energy development
Renewable energy commercialization

References

External links

Renewable Energy in Portugal
Portugal – Renewable energy facts sheet
Renewable energy businesses in  Portugal
Solar Energy Society of Portugal
Portugal: Making Up for Lost Time in Renewable Energy
Europe's biggest wind farm switches on
e2p – Endogenous energies of Portugal